Natalie Jeremijenko  (born 1966) is an artist and engineer whose background includes studies in biochemistry, physics, neuroscience and precision engineering. She is an active member of the net.art movement, and her work primarily explores the interface between society, the environment and technology.  
She has alternatively described her work as "X Design" (short for experimental design) and herself as a "thingker", a combination of thing-maker and thinker. In 2018, she was Artist in Residence at Dartmouth College, and is currently an associate professor at New York University in the Visual Art Department, and has affiliated faculty appointments in the school's Computer Science and Environmental Studies.

Early life and education
She was born in Mackay, Queensland, and raised in Brisbane, the second of ten children to a physician and a schoolteacher. Her parents were champions of domestic technology, and Jeremijenko claims that her mother was the first woman in Australia to own a microwave.

She enrolled in PhDs, in Australia and possibly Stanford University but was not awarded a doctorate.

Transition to art installations
In 1988, Jeremijenko co-founded the Livid rock festival in Brisbane. She credits her involvement in helping her move towards public art as she created installations that would appeal to the young crowd.

Notable works

D4PA: Designed 4 Political Action
A catalogue of devices and strategies for political engagement and direct action developed by the Bureau of Inverse Technology and others. Described by Wired Magazine as "the DARPA of dissent".

Live Wire (Dangling String), 1995
In 1995, as an artist-in-residence at Xerox PARC in Palo Alto, California under the guidance of Mark Weiser, she created an art installation made up of LED cables that lit up relative to the amount of internet traffic. The work is now seen as one of the first examples of ambient or "calm" technology.

OneTrees 
One Tree(s) was a public experiment that provided material and scientific evidence on environmental and cultural issues. It explored issues such as global warming, air quality and genetically modified organisms. This art installation facilitates personal interpretation. It brilliantly uses the concept of information and conceptual art to communicate science. It removes the use of documentation like charts and graphs and challenges the concept of pure visualization in presenting information to its audience.

OOZ
Various technological interfaces to facilitate interaction with natural systems as opposed to virtual systems. These interfaces encourage interactive relationships with non-humans and are intended to accumulate the actions of participants into productive local environmental knowledge and the remediation of urban territories.

HowStuffIsMade
How Stuff is Made (HSIM) is a visual encyclopedia documenting the manufacturing processes, environmental costs and labour conditions involved in the production of contemporary products. This is a wiki-based collectively produced academic project to change the information available on and about the production.

Feral Robots
An open source robotics project providing resources and support for upgrading the raison d'etre of commercially available robotic dog toys; and facilitating mediagenic Feral Robotic Dog Pack Release events. Because the dogs follow concentration gradients of the contaminants they are equipped to sniff, their release renders information legible to diverse participants, provides the opportunity for evidence-driven discussion, and facilitates public participation in environmental monitoring and remediation.

BIT Plane, 1997

The BIT plane is a radio-controlled model aircraft, designed by the Bureau of Inverse Technology and equipped with a micro-video camera and transmitter. Its name could be a reference to bit plane, a set of digital discrete signals. In 1997, it was launched on a series of sorties over the Silicon Valley to capture an aerial rendering.

Guided by the live control-view video feed from the plane, the pilot on the ground could steer the unit deep into the heartlands of the Information Age. Most of the corporate research parks in Silicon Valley are no-camera zones and require US citizen status or special clearance for entry. The bit plane (with an undisclosed citizenship) flew covertly through this rarified information-space, buzzing over the largest concentration of venture capital in the world, returning with several hours of aerial footage.

Suicide Box
Suicide Box consists of motion sensor cameras, placed on the Golden Gate Bridge for an initial 100 day period. The name is a reference to the location, the Golden Gate Bridge ranking amongst the most popular suicide spots in the United States. Cameras were installed without permission from local municipal authorities. Data recorded by the footage, vertical motions assumed to be suicides, came out to an average of .68 suicides per day over the duration of the project. Footage was later compared against information about fluctuations in the Dow Jones Industrial Average, the average being popularly held as an indicator of the economy's health.  A commonly held conception is that suicides increase during times of economic downturn, though the comparison of data from "Suicide Box" when compared to DOW fluctuations indicated no correlations.

Controversies surrounding the work related to its subject matter and authenticity. Questions have been raised with regards to the authenticity of the footage (whether or not what are depicted are actually suicides) and the subject matter (the depiction of actual suicides as part of an art piece).

Biotech Hobbyist magazine
(1st issue) An online magazine with kits and resources to bring biotech to the garage, bedroom, and everyman, to raise the standards of evidence and capacity for public involvement in the political decisions on the biotechnological future.

Bat Billboard, 2008
Created in 2008, this project's goal was to dispel misinformation, as well as educate people on bats, their habitat, and activities. The billboard was an interactive home for bats that would display written messages based on the sonar messages the bats were sending. This work was showcased at MoMA's 2011 exhibit "Talk to Me".

The Art Of The Eco-mindshift, Oct 2009
Jeremijenko gave a TED Talk in October 2009. Here she discussed her various projects and what she was currently working on with the Environmental Health Clinic. In the TED Talk she also discusses what her plans are to improve the environment in industrious areas like New York City.

Chronology of selected works

Awards 

2013 Creative Capital Emerging Fields Award 
 2011 Fast Company'''s Most Influential Women in Technology
 2005 I.D. magazine annual Forty (#37)
 1999 Rockefeller Fellow
 1999 Technology Review'''s Top 100 Young Innovators

Personal life
She was previously married to the sociologist Dalton Conley with whom she had two children: E and Yo. Jeremijenko also has a daughter, Jamba, from a previous relationship.

See also
Critical technical practice

References

Further reading

External links 

 Natalie Jeremijenko's home page with info about projects
 xDesign Environmental Health Clinic
 2012 outdoor work at Socrates Sculpture Park
 Info from Yale University
 Profile of artist with descriptions of her work
 video interview at Connected Environments exhibit at the Neuberger Museum of Art
 MoMA Talk To Me Exhibition Site
 Natalie Jeremijenko TED Talk

1966 births
Living people
20th-century Australian women artists
20th-century Australian artists
21st-century Australian women artists
21st-century Australian artists
20th-century women engineers
21st-century women engineers
Australian women engineers
Critical design practitioners
Australian conceptual artists
Women conceptual artists
Environmental artists
Australian installation artists
Women installation artists
Australian emigrants to the United States
Mass media theorists
Australian digital artists
Women digital artists
Griffith University alumni
University of Queensland alumni
Officers of the Order of Australia
Ubiquitous computing researchers